The 2015 Canada Winter Games, officially known as the XXV Canada Games, is a Canadian multi-sport event that was held from February 12 to March 1, 2015, in Prince George, British Columbia.

Sports

Alpine skiing
Archery
Badminton
Biathlon
Cross-country skiing
Curling
Figure skating
Freestyle skiing
Gymnastics
 Artistic gymnastics (14)
 Trampoline (2)
Ice hockey
 Men's tournament
Judo
Ringette
Shooting
Short track speed skating
Speed skating
Snowboarding
Squash
Synchronized swimming
Table tennis
Wheelchair Basketball

Medal table
The following is the medal table for the 2015 Canada Winter Games.
Key

Calendar
The schedule of events was as follows:

References

External links

Canada Games Medal Tally

 
2015
2015
Canada Winter Games
Canada Winter Games
Sport in Prince George, British Columbia
Canada Winter Games
Winter Games
Winter Games